Channel V at the Hard Rock Live is the third live album released by Richard Marx.

Track listing
 "Can't Help Falling In Love" (duet with Eric Moo) – 4:46
 "Bring It On Home to Me" – 4:07
 "Hazard" – 5:17
 "Endless Summer Nights" – 5:47
 "Now And Forever" – 5:00
 "Right Here Waiting" – 5:13

Richard Marx albums
1995 live albums